Monica Elena Bîrlădeanu ( (born December 12, 1978), professionally known as Monica Dean, is a Romanian actress and model.

Career
Born in Iași, she studied law at the University of Iași. Bîrlădeanu was a popular television host before accepting her first film role in 2004. In 2005, she played a nurse in the award-winning feature The Death of Mr. Lăzărescu. In 2006, she guest starred in the hit United States television show Lost in the episode "The Hunting Party", as Gabriela, a wealthy Italian woman.  In 2005, she starred in the horror movie Incubus.

In November 2002, Bîrlădeanu was designated the most beautiful Romanian celebrity by Beau Monde, and in December she was chosen "The Sexiest TV Star" by TV Mania, one of the most influential Romanian TV guides. Her show went on, and so did the series of awards she got. In February 2003, the VIVA magazine designated her "The most Beautiful Romanian Woman" and in July FHM "crowned" her as "Sexiest Woman". In December, she was, once again, awarded by TV Mania as "The Sexiest TV Celebrity".

In the meantime, she hosted Extravacanzza. 2004 began with a new challenge: the "Viața in Direct" (Life Live) show.

In February 2004 Viva designated her again as the "Sexiest Celebrity" and in December 2004 she was once more named TV Manias "Sexiest TV Star". In 2004 she went to Los Angeles to take acting classes and improve her TV hosting skills. Her career took a new turn: she started doing movies.

In 2004, she played a teenager in the comedy Buds for Life, and by year's end she received a role in her first Romanian movie, The Death of Mr. Lazarescu. The film has so far obtained more than 30 awards, including "Un certain regard" at the 2005 Cannes Film Festival and a Silver Hugo in Chicago. It was nominated for Best Foreign Film at the 2005 Independent Spirit Awards.

Filmography
 Closer to the Moon (2014) .... Sonia Rosenthal
 Despre oameni și melci (2012) ....
 Diaz (2012) ....
 Out of the Night (2011) .... Lia
 Maternity Blues (2011) .... Eloisa
 Vallanzasca – Gli angeli del male (2010) .... Nicoletta
 Francesca (2009) .... Francesca
 Living & Dying (2007) .... Det. Lascar
 Fall Down Dead (2007) .... Helen Ritter
 Second in Command (2006) .... Dr. Johnson
 Incubus (2006) .... Karen
 Caved In (2006) TV movie .... Sophie
 The Death of Mr. Lazarescu (2005) .... Mariana
 Buds for Life (2004) .... Stephanie

Television
 Vlad (2019).... Carla
 Nip/Tuck (2006) .... Attractive Organ Thief - 1 episode - "Shari Noble"
 Lost (2006) .... Gabriela - 1 episode - "The Hunting Party"
 Lombarzilor 8 (2006) .... Ana
 CSI (2014) .... Mystery Woman/Emily Grey - 1 episode - "Boston Brakes"

Video
 Maica Domnului de la parter (2010) .... Doctor
 Stopover (2010) .... Ingrid

External links 
 
 

Romanian television personalities
Romanian female models
Alexandru Ioan Cuza University alumni
Actors from Iași
1978 births
Living people
21st-century Romanian actresses